Three Thousand Years of Longing is a 2022 fantasy romantic drama film directed and produced by George Miller. Written by Miller and Augusta Gore, it is based on the short story "The Djinn in the Nightingale's Eye" by A. S. Byatt and stars Idris Elba as a djinn who is unleashed from a bottle by a professor (Tilda Swinton) and tells her stories from his thousands of years of existence. The film is dedicated to Miller's mother Angela, as well as Rena Mitchell, relative of producer Doug Mitchell.

The film premiered at the Cannes Film Festival on May 20, 2022, where it received a six-minute standing ovation. It was released theatrically in the United States on August 26, 2022, by Metro-Goldwyn-Mayer (via United Artists Releasing), and in Australia on September 1, 2022, by Roadshow Entertainment. It received generally positive reviews from critics, who praised its visuals and performances, but was a box-office bomb, grossing $20 million on a budget of $60 million.

Plot
Alithea Binnie is a British scholar who occasionally suffers from hallucinations of demonic beings. During a trip to Istanbul, Alithea purchases an antique bottle and unleashes the Djinn trapped within it. The Djinn offers to grant Alithea three wishes, so long as each one is truly her heart's desire, but Alithea argues that wishing is a mistake, accusing the Djinn of being a trickster. She tells him that when she was a child, she built herself an imaginary friend in the form of young boy and even imagined his whole life (which she wrote in a diary) but she finally decided to forget about him, fearing to be overwhelmed by her own imagination. In response, the Djinn proceeds to tell her three tales of his past and how he ended up trapped in the bottle.

The Djinn tells the story of the Queen of Sheba, his cousin and lover, being wooed by King Solomon, who imprisons the Djinn in a bottle which is cast into the Red Sea by a bird. The Djinn's second story centers on Gülten, a concubine in the palace of Suleiman the Magnificent. After finding the Djinn's bottle, Gülten wishes for Suleiman's son, Mustafa, to fall in love with her and subsequently wishes to bear his child. Hürrem Sultan, a favored concubine of Suleiman, schemes to have her son on the throne and convinces Suleiman that Mustafa is conspiring against him; this results in Mustafa's murder. Despite the Djinn's attempts to save her, the pregnant Gülten is also killed on Suleiman's orders before she can make her final wish.

The Djinn wanders the palace for over 100 years, invisible due to the concealment of the bottle. He almost captures the attention of Murad IV, but the latter goes to war and becomes a vicious and ruthless ruler, later dying from alcoholism. His brother Ibrahim becomes the new sultan and develops a fetish for fat concubines. His favorite among them, Sugar Lump, uncovers the bottle, whereupon the Djinn appears to her and desperately begs her to make a wish. Sugar Lump thinks him a trickster and wishes for the Djinn to be reimprisoned in his bottle at the bottom of the Bosporus.

In the Djinn's final story, he tells of Zefir, the wife of a Turkish merchant, who is gifted the bottle after it is recovered in the mid-19th century. Zefir wishes first for knowledge, which the Djinn grants in the form of literature, and later to perceive the world as djinns do. Despite the Djinn's growing affection for Zefir and the fact she is now pregnant with his child, she grows increasingly crowded by his presence and her newfound knowledge. The Djinn offers to reside in his bottle whenever she wishes, but Zefir wishes to forget she met the Djinn, leaving him imprisoned and unknown once again. The Djinn's final story moves Alithea to the point where she wishes for Djinn and herself to fall in love, resulting in them having sex.

Afterwards, the Djinn and Alithea decide to travel back to London together. At the airport Alithea has placed the Djinn inside a saltshaker bottle and placed the bottle without the top in one pocket and the top in her other pocket which sets off the sensors when she goes through airport security. An airport security officer investigates the saltshaker by placing a pencil inside and then places the top on the bottle, which he sends through the X-ray machine despite Alithea’s pleas.

One day, Alithea discovers that the Djinn is gradually becoming weaker due to the effects that the city's cell tower and satellite transmissions have when interacting with his electromagnetic physiology. She uses her second wish to get the severely ill Djinn to speak again, apologizes for using her wish to deny them the chance to fall in love naturally, and uses her third and final wish to set the Djinn free, so he is able to return to "The Realm of Djinn".

Three years later, Alithea has written a book containing all the stories that the Djinn told her, like she once did with her childhood imaginary friend. Though expecting never to see him again, the now-healthy Djinn visits Alithea three years later and periodically returns throughout her lifetime.

Cast

 Tilda Swinton as Alithea Binnie
 Alyla Browne as young Alithea Binnie
 Idris Elba as the Djinn
 Erdil Yaşaroğlu as Professor Gühan
 Sarah Houbolt as airport Djinn
 Aamito Lagum as the Queen of Sheba
 Nicolas Mouawad as King Solomon
 Ece Yüksel as Gülten
 Matteo Bocelli as Prince Mustafa
 Lachy Hulme as Sultan Suleiman
 Megan Gale as Hürrem
 Oğulcan Arman Uslu as Murad IV
 Kaan Guldur as young Murad
 Jack Braddy as Ibrahim
 Hugo Vella as young Ibrahim
 Zerrin Tekindor as Kösem
 Anna Adams as Sugar Lump
 David Collins as Ozmet the Jocular
 Burcu Gölgedar as Zefir
 Vince Gil as old merchant
 Melissa Jaffer as Clementine
 Anne Charleston as Fanny
 Danny Lim as storyteller with dog

Production

It was announced in October 2018 that George Miller had set his next directorial effort, described as "epic in scope" and expected to begin filming in 2019. Idris Elba and Tilda Swinton were announced as cast members the same month. The film is based on A. S. Byatt's short story  "The Djinn in the Nightingale's Eye."

In a July 2019 interview, Miller said that pre-production would begin in late 2019, and that filming would begin on March 2, 2020, between Australia, Turkey and the United Kingdom. Filming was delayed due to the COVID-19 pandemic and began in November 2020 in Australia.

Release
In May 2020, Metro-Goldwyn-Mayer (via United Artists Releasing) acquired the film's North American distribution rights, with Metropolitan Filmexport and Sunac Culture handling distribution in France and China respectively. Roadshow Entertainment handled the Australian distribution, while Entertainment Film Distributors handled distribution in the United Kingdom.

The film premiered at the 2022 Cannes Film Festival on May 20, 2022, where it received a six-minute standing ovation. An activist protesting sexual violence perpetrated by Russian soldiers in Ukraine appeared at the premiere and stripped nude while screaming before being removed by Cannes security. The film's first trailer was also released that day.

The film's scheduled release date of August 31, 2022, in the United States, was moved up to August 26. It was released in Australia on September 1, 2022.

MGM and Warner Bros. Home Entertainment released the film for VOD on November 1, 2022, followed by a Blu-ray, DVD and 4K UHD release on November 15, 2022.

Reception

Box office 
Three Thousand Years of Longing grossed $8.3 million in the United States and Canada, and $11.7 million in other territories, for a worldwide total of $20 million.

In the United States and Canada, it was released alongside The Invitation and Breaking. It made $1.4 million on its first day and went on to debut with $2.9 million from 2,436 theaters on its opening weekend. Variety called it "a terrible result for a movie that's playing in thousands of theaters across the country", and noted that it would be one of the biggest box office bombs of 2022, with industry experts blaming lack of marketing and the wide-release strategy. TheWrap, while acknowledging its box office underperformance, noted the film could still turn a profit for MGM after it went to streaming, as the company spent only $6 million on domestic distribution rights. In its second weekend, the film made $1.5 million (and a total of $1.9 million over the four-day Labor Day frame), dropping 47.1% and finishing 13th.

Critical response 
On the review aggregator website Rotten Tomatoes, 71% of 252 critics' reviews are positive, with an average rating of 6.5/10. The website's critics consensus reads, "Although its story isn't as impressive as its visual marvels, it's hard not to admire Three Thousand Years of Longings sheer ambition." Metacritic, which uses a weighted average, assigned the film a score of 60 out of 100, based on 52 critics, indicating "mixed or average reviews". Audiences polled by CinemaScore gave the film an average grade of "B" on an A+ to F scale.

Peter Debruge of Variety said: "These days, audiences are so savvy about the tricks at a filmmaker's disposal that the movie's greatest achievement is that it seizes our imagination (or perhaps that's our attention deficit disorder being so brusquely manhandled) and holds it for the better part of two hours, defying us to anticipate what comes next."

References

External links
 

2022 fantasy films
2022 romantic drama films
2020s American films
2020s Australian films
2020s English-language films
2020s fantasy drama films
2020s romantic fantasy films
American epic films
American fantasy drama films
American romantic drama films
American romantic fantasy films
Australian epic films
Australian fantasy drama films
Australian romantic drama films
Australian romantic fantasy films
Film productions suspended due to the COVID-19 pandemic
FilmNation Entertainment films
Films about wish fulfillment
Films based on One Thousand and One Nights
Films based on short fiction
Films directed by George Miller
Films produced by Doug Mitchell
Films produced by George Miller
Films scored by Junkie XL
Films set in hotels
Films set in Istanbul
Films set in London
Films set in the Ottoman Empire
Films shot in Australia
Films with screenplays by George Miller
Genies in film
Metafictional works
Frame stories
Magic realism films
Metro-Goldwyn-Mayer films